Britons Publishing Society, founded in 1923, was an offshoot of The Britons. According to scholar Gisela C. Lebzelter, The Britons split because:

... internal disagreements proved paralysing. Seven members were excluded in November 1923, and three executives members, J. H. Clarke, the famous British homeopath, R. T. Cooper and W. A. Peters, seceded to establish 'The Britons Publishing Society'.

On 15 December 1923 the three executed a memorandum in which they expressed their organisational purpose as follows:

"propagating views in regard to the Jews, the Christian Religion, the Government of the British Isles and the British Empire,
and other matters which, in our opinion from time to time,
it is in the interests of the British Public should be expressed and distributed and to do anything at all which, in our opinion, equips us for this purpose.

The Society to be conducted not for the purpose of making profit"

Publications 
British Library
    Title: Protocols of the Meetings of the Learned Elders of Zion / translated from the Russian Text by Victor E. Marsden.
    Contributor: Nilus.
    Publication Details: London : The Britons Publishing Society, [between 1937 and 1971].
    Language: English
    Uniform Title: Protocols of the wise men of Zion.
    Identifier: System number 009601120
    Physical Description: 65 p. ; 21 cm.
    Shelfmark(s): Document Supply W73/5522
    UIN: BLL01009601120
Apionus, pseud.
The bolshevists of ancient history ...
(London: The Britons publishing society, 1924)

Anonymous
Related names: Sergi︠e︡ǐ Aleksandrovich Nilus, 1862-1929, Victor E. Marsden (Victor Emile), 1866-1920

Protocols of the Meetings of the Learned Elders of Zion
(London: The Britons Publishing Society, 1931)

Anonymous
Protocols of the Meetings of the Learned Elders of Zion
Translated from the Russian text by Victor E. Marsden
(London: Britons publishing society, 1933)
Related Names: Sergi︠e︡ǐ Aleksandrovich Nilus, 1862-1929, Victor E. Marsden (Victor Emile), 1866-1920

George F. Dillon
Grand Orient Freemasonry unmasked: as the Secret Powers Behind communism through Discovery of Lost Lectures,Delivered at Edinburgh in October 1884
With preface by Dennis Fahey
(London: Britons Publishing Society, c1950; [New and rev. ed.])

 References 
Gisela C. LebzelterHenry Hamilton Beamish and The Britons: Champions of Anti-Semitism''British Fascism, Essays on the Radical Right in Inter-War Britain'''
ed. by Kenneth Lunn and Richard C. Thurlow
(London: Croom Helm, 1980)

See also 
The Britons
John Henry Clarke
Protocols of the Elders of Zion

Antisemitism in the United Kingdom
Political advocacy groups in the United Kingdom
Book publishing companies of the United Kingdom
Political book publishing companies
Far-right politics in the United Kingdom
Protocols of the Elders of Zion
1923 establishments in the United Kingdom